Vile Parle (also known as Parle, pronounced "Parle" or "Parla"), is a suburb and also the name of the railway station in the Western suburb of Mumbai. Vile Parle has a significantly strong base of Gujarati and Marathi population. It serves as the location of the first Parle factory which ceased operations in year 2016. It also houses Terminal 2 (T2) of Mumbai's Chhatrapati Shivaji Maharaj International Airport.

History

Origin of Parle:

A village named Padle near Santacruz and Irle near Andheri and the station named Vidlai Padlai led to the name Vile Parle. In this village, there was a huge colony of Christians called Padale. Current southern village region has the Bhandar Wada as an independent colony. The old road near Bhandar Wada and Padale joins the Sahar village via bullock carts. Hence there is a railway crossing at Padale.

The Wadias purchased Juhu and Parle. They signed a contractual bond up to 1843. The purpose of selling these 2 villages to Mr. Wadia was to increase the population and to increase the amount in treasury. Mr. Wadia had to improve the living conditions in these villages by digging wells, arranging for food, clothing and shelter in order to attract crowd and to sustain a decent population. Wadia used to collect tax from the villagers and pay it to the government. After him, Shri Barve and Shri Agashe were the chief managers of Wadia Trust.

Economy

Vile Parle has now become a second major education center after Churchgate to Charni Road area. The establishment and growth of a huge educational complex are financed by the Shri Vile Parle Kelavani Mandal and Parle Tilak Vidyalaya Association. Thus, a constant flow of students in and out of Vile Parle can be seen throughout the day.

Kingfisher Airlines maintained its head office, the Kingfisher House, in Vile Parle. In 2012 Vijay Mallya was trying to sell the Vile Parle Kingfisher House.

One of the leading Indian confectionery and biscuit manufacturers, Parle Products was started in Vile Parle. There is still a factory in Vile Parle East and it is commonly known as Parle Biscuit Factory. In July 2016, Parle stopped operations at its Vile Parle manufacturing unit and will be replaced by its corporate office. Vile Parle also houses the Garware plastics factory.

Vile Parle is quite famous for its huge number of shops and vendors on the so-called Market Road, which is always buzzing with activity.

Educational institutions

Colleges

Medical Colleges
 Hinduhridaysamrat Balasaheb Thackeray Medical College and Dr. R. N. Cooper Municipal General Hospital
 Smt. Chandaben Mohanbhai Patel Homeopathic Medical College

Engineering Colleges
 Dwarkadas J. Sanghvi College of Engineering
 Mukesh Patel School of Technology Management and Engineering

General Colleges
 M L Dahanukar College
 Mithibai College
 Narsee Monjee College of Commerce & Economics
 Sathaye College (Parle College)
 Usha Pravin Gandhi College of Management

Management Colleges
 Narsee Monjee Institute of Management and Higher Studies
PTVA’s Institute of Management

Schools
 Gokalibai Punamchand Pitambar High School
 Chatrabhuj Narsee Memorial School And N.D. Parekh Pre-Primary School
B.L Ruia High School
 Jamnabai Narsee School
 Madhavrao Bhagwat High School
 M P Shah English High School
 Parle Tilak Vidyalaya English Medium School
St. Joseph's Convent High School, Mumbai
Parle Tilak Vidyalaya Marathi Medium Secondary School
St. Xavier's High School, Vile Parle (W)
 Shree Chandulal Nanavati Vinay Mandir
 Shri Navinchandra Popatlal Kapadia (Thakkar) High School
Shrimati Hiraben Manilal Nanavati English High School
 Utpal Shanghvi School
 GMES High School

References 

Suburbs of Mumbai
2008 Mumbai attacks